The 2016 Warsaw Summit of the North Atlantic Treaty Organization (NATO) was the 27th formal meeting of the heads of state and heads of government of the North Atlantic Treaty Organization, held at the National Stadium in Warsaw, Poland, on 8 and 9 July 2016.

Agenda

Poland
Polish president Andrzej Duda announced in August 2015 that NATO bases in Central Europe were a priority for the Warsaw Summit, and wanted for Poland to be included in the Normandy Format talks. Members of NATO on its eastern flank, who in November 2015 convened into a group called the Bucharest Nine, felt threatened by a revanchist Russia, and he said he will raise the issue with Angela Merkel, who had "previously blocked efforts to place NATO troops in central and eastern Europe, saying it might strain relations with Russia."

Outcomes

 Strengthening the alliance's military presence in the east, with four battalions in Poland, Estonia, Latvia, and Lithuania on a rotational basis – to be in place by 2017. This became known as NATO Enhanced Forward Presence.
 Allies declared Initial Operational Capability of NATO's Ballistic Missile Defence to counter threats posed by Iran and further afield, North Korea, to the European continent.
 Pledge to strengthen individual nations' and collective cyber defences, and recognise cyberspace as a new operational domain.
 Commitment to improve member state resilience.
 Start training and capacity building inside Iraq.
 NATO Boeing E-3 Sentry AWACS surveillance planes to provide information and intelligence to the Global Coalition to counter ISIL from Turkish and international airspace.
 Agreed to an expanded maritime presence in the Mediterranean Sea to cope with the European migrant crisis and human trafficking.
 Continue the Resolute Support Mission in Afghanistan beyond 2016, confirmed funding commitments for Afghan forces until 2020. 
 NATO-Ukraine Commission reviewed the security situation in Ukraine, endorsed government plans for reform, agreed a Comprehensive Assistance Package for Ukraine.
 NATO Secretary General signed a Joint Declaration with the Presidents of the European Council and the European Commission to take partnership between NATO and the European Union to a higher level. Declaration sets out areas where NATO and the EU will step up cooperation – including maritime security and countering hybrid threats posed by a more aggressive Russia.

Future summits
Normally NATO summits take place every two years, but after the Warsaw summit it was announced that the next alliance summit (28th) would take place in 2017 in Brussels to inaugurate the new €1 billion NATO headquarters building.

The next major summit (28th) took place in Brussels in 2017.

Leaders and other dignitaries in attendance

Jens Stoltenberg held his fist NATO summit as  NATO – Secretary General.

Member states
{|
|
  Albania – Prime Minister Edi Rama
  Belgium – Prime Minister Charles Michel
  Bulgaria – President Rosen Plevneliev
  Canada – Prime Minister Justin Trudeau
  Croatia – President Kolinda Grabar-Kitarović
  Czech Republic – President Miloš Zeman
  Denmark – Prime Minister Lars Løkke Rasmussen
  Estonia – Prime Minister Taavi Rõivas
  France – President François Hollande
  Germany – Chancellor Angela Merkel
  Greece – Prime Minister Alexis Tsipras
  Hungary – Prime Minister Viktor Orbán
  Iceland – Prime Minister Sigurður Ingi Jóhannsson
  Italy – Prime Minister Matteo Renzi
  Latvia – President Raimonds Vējonis
  Lithuania – President Dalia Grybauskaitė
  Luxembourg – Prime Minister Xavier Bettel
  Netherlands – Prime Minister Mark Rutte
  Norway – Prime Minister Erna Solberg
  Poland – President Andrzej Duda
  Portugal – Prime Minister António Costa
  Romania – President Klaus Iohannis
  Slovakia – President Andrej Kiska
  Slovenia – Prime Minister Miro Cerar
  Spain – Prime Minister Mariano Rajoy
  Turkey – President Recep Tayyip Erdoğan
  United Kingdom – Prime Minister David Cameron
  United States – President Barack Obama

Non-member states and organisations
  Afghanistan – President Ashraf Ghani
  Armenia – President Serzh Sargsyan
  Australia – Ambassador to Belgium, Luxembourg, the European Union and NATO Mark Higgie
  Austria – Minister for Defence and Sports Hans Peter Doskozil
  Azerbaijan – President Ilham Aliyev
  Bosnia and Herzegovina – Chairman of the Presidency Bakir Izetbegović
  European Union – President of the European Council Donald Tusk
  European Union – President of the European Commission Jean-Claude Juncker
  Finland – President Sauli Niinistö
  Georgia – President Giorgi Margvelashvili
  Ireland – Minister of State for Defence Paul Kehoe
  Jordan – Deputy Prime Minister and Minister of Foreign Affairs and Expatriate Affairs Nasser Judeh
  Macedonia – Minister of Defence Zoran Jolevski
  Republic of Moldova – Minister of Defence Anatol Șalaru
  Montenegro – Prime Minister Milo Đukanović
  Sweden – Prime Minister Stefan Löfven
  Switzerland – Minister of Defence, Civil Protection and Sports Guy Parmelin
  Ukraine – President Petro Poroshenko
  United Arab Emirates – Minister of State for Defence Affairs Mohammed Ahmad Al Bowardi

See also
 Article 3 of the North Atlantic Treaty

References

Further reading
 New Polish President Makes NATO Bases in Central Europe a Priority for Warsaw Summit
 NATO: The Enduring Alliance 2016. Twenty Vital Defence Planning and Related Questions the NATO Warsaw Summit Should Address

External links 
2016 Warsaw Summit – NATO

Diplomatic conferences in Poland
2016 conferences
21st-century diplomatic conferences (NATO)
NATO summits
Events in Warsaw
Poland and NATO
2010s in Warsaw
July 2016 events in Europe
2016 in Poland
2016 in international relations